The Gus Engeling Wildlife Management Area is located in Central Texas, 21 miles from Palestine, Texas.

Originally named the Derden Wildlife Management Area (after Milze L. Derden, from whom much of this land was purchased), it was renamed in 1952 after Gus A. Engeling, the first biologist assigned to the area, who was shot and killed by a poacher on December 13, 1951.

References

Wildlife management areas of Texas
Protected areas of Anderson County, Texas